Andriy Bashlay (born 16 February 1985) is a Ukrainian professional football defender from Kiev.

External links 

 Official Website Profile

1985 births
Living people
Footballers from Kyiv
Ukrainian footballers
Ukraine student international footballers
Ukraine under-21 international footballers
Ukrainian expatriate footballers
FC Dynamo-2 Kyiv players
FC Dynamo-3 Kyiv players
FC Arsenal Kyiv players
FC Obolon-Brovar Kyiv players
FC Prykarpattia Ivano-Frankivsk (2004) players
FC Knyazha Shchaslyve players
FC Stal Alchevsk players
FC Sevastopol players
FC Sevastopol-2 players
FC Nyva Ternopil players
PFC Sumy players
FC Tytan Armyansk players
Expatriate footballers in Moldova
Association football defenders
Universiade gold medalists for Ukraine
Universiade medalists in football
Medalists at the 2007 Summer Universiade
Medalists at the 2009 Summer Universiade